Arthur Zachariah Button, later Cox (1815–1870) was an English cricketer. Button was born in Stifford, Essex and played only one first-class level match - for the Marylebone Cricket Club in July 1838. A batsman and bowler of unknown handedness, he scored ten while batting last in the order, then took one wicket with the ball as the MCC drew with an Oxford University cricket team.

In 1858, his relative Philip Zachariah Cox died and Button changed his last name to "Cox" to qualify for a share of the estate. Cox served as a Deputy Lieutenant of the County of Essex, a Justice of the Peace, and a Master of Fox Hounds. He was also an officer in the Essex militia.

He and his wife, Julienne Emily ( Saunders), had seven children. Their third son was Major General Sir Percy Zachariah Cox (1864-1937), an important figure in the creation of the modern Middle East.

Their second son Lt. Col. Edward Henry Cox (b. 1863) also had a distinguished military career, being mentioned in dispatches and earning a Queen's South Africa Medal with five clasps, the King's South Africa Medal with two clasps, and the Distinguished Service Order during the Boer War.

Notes

External links
 

1815 births
1870 deaths
Military personnel from Essex
British Militia officers
Deputy Lieutenants of Essex
People from Stifford
Marylebone Cricket Club cricketers
English cricketers of 1826 to 1863
English cricketers